Hyloxalus idiomelus (Rivero's rocket frog) is a species of frogs in the family Dendrobatidae. It is endemic to the northern part of the Cordillera Central of northern Peru.

Description
Males measure  and females  in snout–vent length. The body is robust. Skin on dorsum is smooth to shagreen. Dorsum is dull tan to rich orange-brown to grayish tan in colour, with green tint in some places. Dorsolateral stripe is pinkish tan, yellowish orange, or cream coloured.

Habitat and conservation
Its natural habitats are humid tropical montane forests, typically near seepages and along small streams. It has also been recorded from disturbed forest and cultivated land. Tadpoles develop in slow-moving and sometimes marshy streams where they are carried on the back of their father.

Major threats to Hyloxalus idiomelus are unknown, although chytridiomycosis is a potential threat. The species is not known to occur in any protected areas.

References

idiomelus
Amphibians of the Andes
Amphibians of Peru
Endemic fauna of Peru
Taxa named by Juan A. Rivero
Amphibians described in 1991
Taxonomy articles created by Polbot